Yu Bin (Chinese: 俞斌; Pinyin: Yú Bīn; born April 16, 1967) is a Chinese professional Go player.

Biography 
Yu Bin is one of China's best Go players. He became 9 dan in 1991 at the age of 24.

Results

References

1967 births
Chinese Go players
Living people
Sportspeople from Zhejiang
People from Taizhou, Zhejiang